Thijs van Hofwegen (born 30 November 1992), is a Dutch footballer who plays as a defensive midfielder. He formerly played for FC Utrecht and NEC.

External links
 Voetbal International profile 
 

1992 births
Living people
Dutch footballers
Association football defenders
FC Utrecht players
NEC Nijmegen players
Eredivisie players
Eerste Divisie players
People from Haarlemmermeer
Footballers from North Holland
Jong FC Twente players
21st-century Dutch people